Bowman Field  is a privately owned public-use airport located four nautical miles (4.6 mi, 7.4 km) southeast of the central business district of Livermore Falls, a town in Androscoggin County, Maine, United States.

Facilities and aircraft 
It has one runway designated 2/20 with a turf surface measuring 2,201 by 120 feet (671 x 37 m).

For the 12-month period ending August 17, 2010, the airport had 2,500 general aviation aircraft operations, an average of 208 per month. At that time there were 15 aircraft based at this airport: 73% single-engine and 27% ultralight.

References

External links 
 Aerial photo as of 1 May 1998 from USGS The National Map
 

Airports in Androscoggin County, Maine